Ferdinand Koblavi Dra Goka (1919-2007) was a Ghanaian teacher and politician. He was a Volta Regional minister, and as Ghana's second finance minister during the first republic. He is often credited as the man who changed the name of Trans Volta Togoland to the Volta Region.

Early life and education
Goka was born on 7 November 1919 to Reverend F. D. Goka at Mafi Anfoe in the Volta Region.
He was educated at Evangelical Presbyterian Church (E. P. C.) Middle School in Hohoe where he obtained his Cambridge School Certificate in 1941. He went on to study at the Akropong Presbyterian Training College from 1943 to 1944. He entered the Ewe Presbyterian Theological Seminary at Ho and qualified as a catechist.

Career and politics
After his basic education Goka was employed as a pupil teacher in 1934 at his hometown Mafi Anfoe in the Volta Region. After qualifying as a Certificate A Grade I teacher he took an appointment at the Keta Presbyterian Middle School in January 1946. He resigned his teaching appointment in June 1948 and took office as the Assistant Education Secretary of Anlo-Tongu District Education Committee.

Goka later ventured politics and in June 1954 he was elected member of the legislative assembly and that same year he was appointed Minesterial Secretary (deputy minister) for the Ministry of Health. He was appointed Regional Commissioner for the Volta Region in June 1959 and on 1 July 1960 he became the Minister for Trade. On 8 May 1961 he was appointed Minister for Finance and later that year, the Ministry of Trade and the Ministry of Finance were merged. On 1 October 1961 he became the Minister for Trade and Finance. He worked in that capacity until 1964 when he was replaced by Kwesi Amoako Atta.

Death and tribute
He died in 2007. Togbe Kwasinyi Agyeman IV, the Fia (Chief) of Adidome, described him as; "the greatest son of Mafiland" in his funeral tribute.

References

1919 births
2007 deaths
Ghanaian MPs 1951–1954
Ghanaian MPs 1954–1956
Ghanaian MPs 1956–1965
Ghanaian MPs 1965–1966
Finance ministers of Ghana
Convention People's Party (Ghana) politicians
20th-century Ghanaian politicians
Presbyterian College of Education, Akropong alumni
Trade ministers of Ghana
Ghanaian Presbyterians